Ralph Emerson Truman (May 10, 1880 – April 30, 1962) was an American major general who led the 35th Division of the Arkansas, Kansas, Missouri, and Nebraska National Guards between 1938 and 1941.

He served in the Spanish–American War as well as World War I, when he was promoted to captain.

In October 1941, he was relieved of his command. This was part of a purge of over-age or inefficient officers in the Army in the run-up to potential American entry into World War II. Rather than being assigned to an administrative position, General Truman chose to resign. With the entry of the U.S. into World War II, his resignation was recalled, but for want of a suitable assignment, Truman was placed on the inactive list on 15 January 1942. He was retired for age from the Missouri National Guard upon his 64th birthday in May 1944.

He was the father of Lieutenant General Louis W. Truman, who led Third United States Army from 1965 until 1967, and the cousin of President Harry S. Truman who also served in the 35th Infantry Division.

Military service 

 Federal service (Spanish-American War) - Private, corporal Infantry, 21 May 1898 to 20 May 1901

 Second lieutenant, Infantry, Missouri National Guard, 19 June 1916

 Federal service (Mexican Border) - Second lieutenant, Infantry, 27 June 1916 to 28 February 1917

 Second lieutenant, Infantry, Missouri National Guard, to 25 March 1917

 Federal service (World War I) - Second lieutenant, Infantry, 26 March 1917; first lieutenant, 28 January 1918; captain, 16 July 1918; major, 1 March 1919 to 28 May 1919 

 Captain, Infantry, Missouri National Guard, 5 May 1921; lieutenant colonel, 24 January 1924; colonel, 22 September 1932; major general of the line, 28 October 1938 to 15 January 1942 (retired for age, 10 May 1944).

 Officers Reserve Corps captain 10 December 1921; lieutenant colonel 29 February 1924 to 26 April 1927

References

External links
Generals of World War II

1880 births
1962 deaths
American military personnel of the Spanish–American War
American military personnel of World War I
People from Kansas City, Missouri
Truman family
United States Army generals
United States Army generals of World War II
United States Army personnel of World War I
Burials at Springfield National Cemetery